Animal, Vegetable, Mineral? was a popular British television game show which ran from 1952 to 1959. In the show, a panel of archaeologists, art historians, and natural history experts were asked to identify interesting objects or artefacts from museums from Britain and abroad, and other faculties, including university collections.

The quiz show was presented by the BBC, continuing a long history of bringing contributors to archaeology into the media limelight. Writing in 1953, the critic C.A. Lejeune described the show as having "a sound, full-bodied, vintage flavour".

History
The UK television show was modelled on an American TV show called What in the World? that was developed by Froelich Rainey. The first episode of Animal, Vegetable, Mineral? was broadcast in October 1952 and was hosted by Lionel Hale and produced by Paul Johnstone. Hale soon stood down as chairman, after an early episode in which he was challenged by Thomas Bodkin about the age of one of the objects shown, in favour of the archaeologist Glyn Daniel, who continued as the regular chairman and scorer for the next seven years.

The most frequent member of the discussion panel was the renowned archaeologist Sir Mortimer Wheeler, who was voted TV personality of the year in 1954, providing the world of archaeology with its first media star. Daniel won the award the following year.

The last episode of original series was broadcast in 1959, after which the programme was cancelled, partly because of Daniel's association with Anglia Television. It was briefly, and unsuccessfully, revived as A.V.M? in 1971, directed by Bob Toner, with Barry Cunliffe as the chairman.

Programme information
The person responsible for choosing the artefact for each episode was Sir David Attenborough, who was also the camera director. However, on the Christmas special in 1956, Glyn Daniel and Sir Mortimer Wheeler selected items for Attenborough and other production staff to examine.

Inauthentic items were occasionally included: for example, a stone axe made by the forger 'Flint Jack' or fake Crown Derby ware. On one occasion, Sir Julian Huxley was unable to identify a modern mock-up of a stuffed great auk as a fake, and on another Huxley lost a £1 bet after failing to recognise the egg of the African giant snail. Occasionally the presenter would try to fool the panel with a corroded modern artefact e.g. a part of a pram or a bicycle.

The signature music for the series was the prelude to Partita No. 3 in E major by Johann Sebastian Bach.

Controversies
Wheeler often "cheated" by investigating beforehand which objects had been removed from their next location, and looking up the relevant information about the corresponding items in catalogues. Nevertheless, Wheeler once stormed off set after taking offence when a junior producer offered to show him the planned items before an episode was filmed.

In 1957, an episode was broadcast in which the panel were asked to identify the ethnic origins of a selection of human volunteers. The anthropologist Margaret Mead disrupted the episode by repeatedly claiming that examples of each ethnic group could be seen at Grand Central Station in New York City. Mead was not invited to take part in the show again.

On one occasion, a BBC spokesman stated that Glyn Daniel presented the show while suffering from influenza, as during a discussion about a sheaf of poisoned arrows from the Sarawak State Museum he said on air that "there are a few million people I would like to kill – mostly viewers". Attenborough explained in his autobiography that Daniel had presented the programme while drunk. On another occasion, Leigh Ashton, the Director of the Victoria and Albert Museum, also appeared while drunk, and fell asleep after incorrectly stating the first three objects shown to be fakes.

On one of the show's overseas visits, an episode had to be re-located to the Musée de l'Homme in Paris after the National Archaeological Museum refused permission to film.

Legacy
The show was the forerunner of other popular BBC archaeology programmes, such as Buried Treasure and Chronicle. It was credited with contributing to the rise in popularity of archaeology in Britain in the 1950s, which resulted in increased museum attendance and library use. On several occasions it caused museums' identifications of objects to be amended based on information provided by the panel or by the viewing public.

Its format was often referenced in comedy shows: Not Only...But Also, At Last the 1948 Show, Do Not Adjust Your Set and The Complete and Utter History of Britain each contained sketches with experts analyzing a "mystery object", often resulting in totally wrong conclusions or, in At Last the 1948 Show, in the items getting destroyed. Even in the 21st century, Animal, Vegetable, Mineral? was still referenced in the second episode of The Armstrong & Miller Show: Its simple set-up was parodied with a fictional black & white program called "How many hats?".

In September 2011, University College London performed a one-off revival of Animal, Vegetable, Mineral?. The panel of experts included Claire Thomson (Scandinavian Studies), Ryan Nichol (Physics and Astronomy), Tom Stern (Philosophy) and Sam Turvey (Institute of Zoology). It was hosted by Joe Flatman (Institute of Archaeology) and consisted of a visit to the UCL museum.

Episodes

Only four episodes exist in the BBC's archives, three of which are available to watch from the BBC iPlayer. The fourth one is mute, because its audio track has been lost.

Some (incomplete) episode information follows:

Cast and crew
A partial cast list is available.

References

BBC Television shows
1950s British game shows